Rolando Ramos Dizon (October 31, 1944 – April 25, 2012) is a Filipino De La Salle Brother who was the President of De La Salle University and the De La Salle University System from 1998 to 2003, Chairman of the Commission on Higher Education from March 2003 to September 2004, Director-at-Large of the Catholic Educational Association of the Philippines from 1998 to 2003, and Acting Brother Visitor of the De La Salle Brothers in the Philippines from 1976 to 1977 as well as a member of President Gloria Macapagal Arroyo's Consultative Commission on Charter Change from September to October 2005.

He was an Associate Professorial Lecturer of the Educational Leadership and Management Department of the De La Salle University-Manila College of Education. He was assigned in Bethlehem University, a De La Salle school in Palestine from August 2008 to June 2009. Bro. Rolly was assigned to De La Salle University Manila until his death.

Life 
Dizon was born in Bacolod, Negros Occidental, Philippines on October 31, 1944, to Raymundo L. Dizon of Porac, Pampanga and Hermelinda V. Ramos of Negros Occidental. Dizon was the fifth of six children. When La Salle College opened in Bacolod in 1952, Rolando was enrolled as a Grade Three student. He finished grade school in 1957 as Valedictorian of his class, and high school in 1961 as Valedictorian and Student Council President.

Encouraged by Br. Francis Cody and inspired by Br. Andrew Gonzalez, his former high school teacher in Bacolod, Dizon entered the La Salle Brothers' Postulancy right after high school. He made his first vows on October 11, 1962, and began his undergraduate studies at De La Salle College in Manila. After two years of studying, he was sent by the De La Salle Brothers to The Catholic University of America in 1965 where he finished his Bachelor of Arts, Major in Mathematics in 1968.

Brother Dizon's first assignment after returning to the Philippines was in La Salle Green Hills, where he taught math and religion in the High School department for a year before being appointed Grade School Principal in 1969, High School Principal in 1971 and Acting President in 1973.

Educational background 
Dizon finished his primary and secondary education at the University of St. La Salle in Bacolod, Negros Occidental. He then studied his first two years of college at De La Salle College in Manila. He continued his undergraduate studies at The Catholic University of America U.S.A., graduating with a Bachelor of Arts degree in Mathematics. He then took up his Master of Arts degree in Education Administration at De La Salle University Manila and took up his Doctorate degree in International Development Education at the Stanford Graduate School of Education.

Awards 
In 2006, Dizon was given the Distinguished Lasallian Award by the De La Salle Alumni Association in De La Salle University-Manila. Also in March 2007, he was inducted in the De La Salle Sports Hall of Fame.

See also 
 List of people from De La Salle University-Manila

References

External links 
 Philippine Lasallian Family
 De La Salle Alumni Association
 De La Salle Philippines
 De La Salle University Manila
 University of Saint La Salle - Bacolod

1944 births
2012 deaths
People from Bacolod
De La Salle Brothers in the Philippines
De La Salle University alumni
Roman Catholic religious brothers
Filipino Roman Catholics
Filipino educators
Filipino writers
Chairpersons of the Commission on Higher Education of the Philippines
Araneta family
Kapampangan people
Catholic University of America alumni
Stanford University alumni
Stanford Graduate School of Education alumni
Arroyo administration cabinet members
Presidents of universities and colleges in the Philippines
Visayan people